Erythrocyte membrane protein band 4.1 like 5 is a protein in humans that is encoded by the EPB41L5 gene.

References

Further reading